Queen Anne of England may refer to:

Anne Neville (1456–1485), queen consort of England 1483–1485
Anne Boleyn (c.1501–1536), queen consort of England 1533–1536
Anne of Cleves (1515–1557), queen consort of England January-July 1540
Anne of Denmark (1574–1619), queen consort of England (1603–1619), Scotland, and Ireland
Anne, Queen of Great Britain (1665–1714), who was queen regnant of the Kingdom of Great Britain and queen regnant of Ireland

See also
 Queen Anne (disambiguation)